Perry Noble (born June 24, 1971) is an American preacher, author, and the senior pastor of the Second Chance Church.

Early life and family
Perry Noble was born on June 24, 1971. Perry has revealed that his mother died of cancer when he was 12, and that this experience made him dislike hospital visits for a long time even after he became a pastor.

Ministry
He founded NewSpring Church in Anderson, South Carolina in January 2000. His weekly sermons were watched by over 32,000 people at 11 satellite campuses across the state of South Carolina with an additional 7,200 viewers tuned in weekly via online live stream. 

Perry started a new Church in Anderson in 2018 and opened as a church plant in January 2019 under the name Second Chance Church.

Personal life 
His father was married several times. He married his former wife, Lucretia, in April 2000 and in June 2007 had a baby girl named Charisse.

In November 2017 Noble announced that his marriage was over.

In May 2021, Perry remarried Shannon Repokis.

Controversies

Racism
During a Christmas Eve service in 2014, Perry Noble sparked an incident regarding the use of what appeared to be the word nigger. NewSpring Church released a statement in response to allegations that Pastor Noble said the word nigger during his sermon saying, 

Perry Noble was also quoted as saying ″I was also a racist. My grandparents used 'the n word' recreationally. In fact, most white people I knew did —and so I did too. I did not see black people as individual people with real hearts, real souls, real feelings and who really mattered to God — I saw them as a group of people who were different than me, thus allowing me to place them in a category and dismiss them as unimportant," said Perry. He continues, "But … something happened in me in 1990 that would begin to change (and is still changing) the way I see people — I prayed to receive Christ in my life, which truly is the catalyst for the changing of my heart and mind on the issue of the Confederate flag," continued the megachurch pastor.″

Ten Commandments
Following a sermon Noble delivered on Christmas Eve, a controversy arose regarding his wording at the beginning of his message. He made a claim stating that there was no Hebrew word for "command," when in fact, there was. Much pressure was put on Perry Noble and on NewSpring Church for this mistake, to the point of a heated tweet on Noble's Twitter page. Noble later apologized on his blog for this tweet and his original mistake.

Removal 
On July 10, 2016, NewSpring Church announced that Perry Noble had been removed as Senior Pastor, due to alcohol abuse and neglect of his family duties.

Divorce
On November 1, 2017, Noble released a statement on Faithwire announcing his divorce from Lucretia Noble after 17 years of marriage. He stated that, “After being married for 17 years I have found myself in a place I never imagined I would be — as no one who has ever been married ever dreams in a million years that their marriage will one day end in divorce.”

Publications
 Blue Prints: How to Build Godly Relationships
 Unleash!: Breaking Free from Normalcy
 Overwhelmed: Winning the War Against Worry
 The Most Excellent Way to Lead
 Overcoming Anxiety: A 30day Guide to Start Winning The War with Anxiety.Overwhelmed (2014) Overcoming Anxiety'' (2019)

References

External links 
You're Welcome Here

1971 births
Living people